Aida is a 1911 American film directed by Oscar Apfel and J. Searle Dawley and starring Mary Fuller, Marc McDermott, Nancy Avril and Charles Ogle. It was produced by Edison Film Company.

Cast
 Guy Coombs as King of Ethiopia, Aida's Father
 Robert Brower as High Priest of Isis
 Charles Ogle as King of Egypt
 Marc McDermott as Radames
 Nancy Avril as Amneris
 Mary Fuller as Aida

References

External links
 

1910s English-language films
1911 films
American silent short films
American black-and-white films
Films directed by J. Searle Dawley
Films directed by Oscar Apfel
1910s American films